Valhermoso Springs is an unincorporated community in Morgan County, Alabama, United States. Valhermoso Springs has a post office with ZIP code 35775.

2020 shooting
On June 4, 2020, police received 9-1-1 calls about shots being fired at Talucah Road. Upon responding, they found a house on fire. When the flames were extinguished, the bodies of three females, four males, and a dog were discovered; all of them had suffered gunshot wounds. Police announced the incident was a targeted attack, and by the next day, all seven victims were identified. Legg and Rogers were allegedly motivated by an internal dispute in a club in which they and three of the victims were members.

Notable people
 Henderson Ryan, early 20th century architect in Seattle
 Al Williams, former Major League Baseball player for the Philadelphia Athletics

References

Unincorporated communities in Morgan County, Alabama
Unincorporated communities in Alabama